The Sunrise Cooperative Farm Community, also known as the Sunrise Colony, was a communal living experiment founded by Jewish anarchists on 10,000 acres of farmland near Saginaw, Michigan, between 1933 and 1936, during the Great Depression.

References

Further reading

External links 

 Papers at the University of Michigan

1933 establishments in Michigan
Intentional communities in the United States
Anarchist intentional communities
Jewish anarchism
Jews and Judaism in Michigan
Historic Jewish communities in the United States